Enissa Amani (Persian: انیسا امانی; born 8 December 1981 in Tehran, Iran) is an Iranian-German comedian, artist and activist. She was the first European Women with an international Netflix Special in 2018 called “Ehrenwort” and a follow up Short-Special called “Comedians of the World” also on Netflix. She produced an hosted a viral panel talk about racism called “Die beste Instanz”in 2020, which led her to win the German “Grimme Online Preis” which is the most prestigious german award. Her comedy often focuses on the subjects of politics, social issues, racism, and ethnicity.

Life and career 

Amani studied Law at the university of cologne in germany and won several beauty pageants, such as Miss West-Germany She quit law to study literature and philosophy and presented as a host on QVC for only a few months before she went to an open mic in 2013. 
Shortly thereafter, she appeared in  several German TV and late night shows and won the German Comedy Award “Deutscher Comedy Preis” for best Newcomer of the Year in 2015.

The duo took fourth place.
In 2018 she was the first german and first European woman with an international Netflix Special “Ehrenwort”
And a second one “Comedians of the World” in 2019.
In 2020 she created, produced, and hosted a show about racism called “Die beste Instanz” which led her to win the prestigious German “Grimme Online Preis”.
Since 2019 she is a prominent activist for human rights targeting racism in Germany, human rights in Iran, Sexism, Afghanistan, Antisemitism and Islamophobia.
She is regularly invited by politicians to hold speeches such as on the Frankfurt Römerberg for Black Live Matter in 2020 and Woman Life Freedom in 2022.
Since 2019 she started doing English standup and had shows in the Soho Theater in London and appearances at the Laugh Factory Los Angeles, and the Comedy Cellar New York. The German Broadcaster ZDF accompanied her to New York for the Documentary “Heroes”.
On Instagram she is followed by the german foreign minister and several german high ranking politicians. 
On November 2022 she went viral with a clip from her appearance on the Political Satirical Show “Die Anstalt” with a speech about humanity.

She won several Awards:
2015: Deutscher Comedy Preis “Best Newcomer”
2019 “Glammy Award” “Charakter des Jahres 2019” Character of the year 2019 “Glammy Award” from the Glamour Germany-Magazin

2021 Grimme Online Preis for “Die beste Instanz” 

2022 Emotion Magazin Award
2022 “Hamza Kurtovic” Award for fight against Racism
2022 Hurz Award “außerordentliche Leistungen für die Gesellschaft”

Films (selection)
 2014: Ladies' Night (comedy)
 2014: The Satire Summit (comedy) 
 2015: Let’s Dance (reality competition)
 2015: Fack ju Göhte 2 (film)
 2018: Enissa Amani: Ehrenwort (stand-up comedy)
 2019: Enissa Amani “Comedians of the World” (standup comedy) Netflix

References

External links

 

German women comedians
1981 births
People from Tehran
Iranian emigrants to Germany
Living people